Abd al-Malik ibn Abd al-Aziz ibn Jurayj (80 AH/699 CE - 150 AH/767 CE) was an eighth-century faqīh, exegete and hadith transmitter from the Taba' at-Tabi'in.

Biography
Ibn Jurayj was born in Mecca in 70 AH/699 CE. His father Abd al-Aziz was reportedly a faqīh, while his grandfather Jurayj was of Byzantine origin; Jurayj is an Arabic rendition of the Greek name Grēgórios. He was raised as a mawla (client) of the Al-Khalid ibn Asid clan of Banu Umayya, who had enslaved his grandfather. 

At the age of 15, he was accepted to the study circle of Meccan jurist Ata ibn Abi Rabah after previously being rejected for lacking knowledge on Quran recitation and Islamic inheritance laws. After remaining with Ata for around 18 years, he left to study under Amr ibn Dinar until 120 AH/738 CE. During this period, he also attended the lectures of Mujahid ibn Jabr, Ibn Abi Mulayka and Nafi Mawla Ibn Umar. He eventually took on students of his own, most notably the historian Al-Waqidi and jurist Sufyan ibn ʽUyaynah. Marrying a woman known in biographical sources for her piety, Ibn Jurayj had a son, Abd al-Aziz, and a grandson, al-Walid, taking on the kunya Abu al-Walid.

Although he rarely travelled outside the Hejaz, Ibn Jurayj visited Iraq and Yemen towards the end of his life, staying in Baghdad and Sanaa. He died on 11 Dhu al-Hijjah 150 AH/768 CE.

Views 
Ibn Jurayj believed in the permissibility of nikah mut'ah. The number of mut'ah marriages he contracted is given variously as 60 by Jarir ibn Abdullah al-Dabbi, 70 by Al-Shafi‘i and 90 by Al-Dhahabi, although narrations present in later sources describe Ibn Jurayj retracting this opinion. Harald Motzki suggests his view on mut'ah accorded with a Meccan school tradition that was originated by Ibn Abbas and developed by his student Ata ibn Abi Rabah, and thus did not stem from the Sunni-Shi'ite dispute on the matter.

Legacy

Works 
Ibn Jurayj's collection of traditions, reportedly titled Kitab al-Sunan, is credited with pioneering the standard structure of fiqh works and beginning the musannaf genre. His student Abd al-Razzaq ibn Hammam claimed he was the first to arrange traditions in subject order, dividing them into chapters named 'books'. Ibn al-Nadim, who was familiar with the work, stated it was similar in form to later works of sunan - containing, for example, a chapter (kitāb) on salah followed by a chapter on zakat. 

He also reportedly authored books on tafsir and manasik, referred to in later sources as Kitāb al-Tafsir and Kitāb al-Manāsik respectively. However, according to Ahmad ibn Hanbal, the work on tafsir in fact consisted of his students' recordings of the lectures he gave on the subject. In 2020, his tafsir was published for the first time after a manuscript of the work was discovered. It contained commentary on surahs An-Nisa to Al-Waqi'a.

Hadith 
Hadith transmitted by Ibn Jurayj are present in all six of the canonical Sunni hadith collections. During his stay in Yemen, Ibn Jurayj's lectures were attended by ʽAbd al-Razzaq al-Sanʽani, who included 5,000 of the traditions taught in his musannaf.

Ibn Jurayj's status as a hadith transmitter was viewed positively by his student Yahya ibn Sa'id al-Qattani, although he cast doubt on those traditions which had been transmitted from memory and where an informant had been concealed (tadlis). The evaluation of Ibn Jurayj being a trustworthy transmitter when not practicing tadlis was also shared by later hadith critics, including Ahmad ibn Hanbal, Yahya ibn Maʻin and Ali ibn al-Madini. More recently, Motzki assessed Ibn Jurayj's material in ʽAbd al-Razzaq al-Sanʽani's musannaf, concluding he did not forge the traditions he transmitted.

See also 

 Ma'mar ibn Rashid
 Ibn Shihab al-Zuhri
 Hadith studies

References

Isra'iliyyat narrators
Hadith compilers
Hadith scholars
760s deaths
699 births
Arab people of Greek descent